This is a list of monarchs who lost their thrones before the 13th century.



A

Kingdom of Abkhazia 
Adarnase of Abkhazia, ruled from 880 to 887/888, deposed and executed by Bagrat I.
Bagrat I of Abkhazia, ruled from 887/88 to 898/99.
Theodosius III of Abkhazia, forced to abdicate in 978.

Alamannia and Rhaetia (Swabia) 

Charles the Fat, King of Alamannia and Rhaetia 876–887, deposed, died 888.

Duchy of Amalfi 

Manso, Prefect of Amalfi, Prefect of Amalfi from 898 to 914, retired to a monastery.
Sergius II of Amalfi, 1007–1028, deposed.
Manso II of Amalfi, 1028 to 1029, from 1034 to 1038, and from 1043 to 1052.
John II of Amalfi, 1029–1069 with many interruptions.
John III of Amalfi, 1073, deposed.
Marinus Sebastus of Amalfi, 1096–c. 1100. Deposed.

County of Anjou 

Geoffrey III, Count of Anjou, 1060–1068, deposed 1068 and imprisoned, but freed by the intervention of the Pope, died in 1096.
Fulk of Jerusalem, 1106–1129, died 1143.

Duchy of Apulia 

Roger II of Sicily, 1127–1130, deposed when his duchy became a part of his new Kingdom of Sicily.

Duchy of Aquitaine 

Waiofar, deposed 760.
Ebalus, Duke of Aquitaine, deposed 892, restored 902. Died 935.

County of Aragon 

Aznar Galíndez I, 809–820, died 839
Andregoto Galíndez, 922–925, died after 926.

County of Arles 

Boso, Margrave of Tuscany, 895–911 and 926–931.

County of Armagnac 

Bernard II Tumapaler, 1020 to 1061, died 1064/1090.

Kingdom of Armenia 

Tigranes V of Armenia, ruled 6-12, deposed by rebels.
Mithridates of Armenia, 35–37 and 42–51.
Tiridates I of Armenia, 53 and 54–56.
Rhadamistus, 51–53 and 53–54.
Tigranes VI of Armenia, from 58 to 63, forced to abdicate.
Erato of Armenia, reigning three times.

Kingdom of Asturias 
Bermudo I of Asturias, abdicated 791.
Nepotian of Asturias, 842.

Assyria 

Ashur-nirari V, King of Assyria 755–745 BC, overthrown.
Marduk-apla-iddina II, King of Assyria 722–710 BC, died 702.

County of Auvergne 

Firminus, Count of Auvergne c. 555 or 558, deposed, restored, 560–571.

Kingdom of Aksum 

Kaleb of Axum, said to have abdicated c. 520.
'Anbasa Wedem, in the 9th–10th century, deposed.

B

Babylonia 
Marduk-zakir-shumi II, King of Babylon 703 BC, overthrown.
Marduk-apla-iddina II, King of Babylon 722–710 BC, and 703–702 BC. Deposed and later retreated to Elam.
Sennacherib, King of Babylon 705–703 BC  and 689–681 BC.
Bel-ibni, King of Babylon 703–700 BC, deposed 700 BC.
Nergal-ushezib, King of Babylon 694–693 BC, deposed and defeated by Assyria in 693 BC.
Nabonidus, King of Babylon, deposed in 539BC due to the conquest of Babylon by the Persians.

Bavaria 

Grifo, Duke of Bavaria 748, deposed 748, died c. 753.
Tassilo III, Duke of Bavaria, Duke of Bavaria 748 to 787, deposed 787, died c. 796.
Louis the German, King of Bavaria 817–843, lost Bavaria after the Treaty of Verdun, died 876.
Engeldeo, Margrave of Bavaria 890–895, deposed 895.
Eberhard, Duke of Bavaria, Duke of Bavaria 937 – 938, deposed 938.
Henry II, Duke of Bavaria, Duke of Bavaria 955–976 and 985–995.
Henry III, Duke of Bavaria, 983–985, deposed 985, died 989.
Henry II, Holy Roman Emperor, Duke of Bavaria 995–1005.
Henry III, Holy Roman Emperor, Duke of Bavaria 1026–1041.
Conrad I, Duke of Bavaria, Duke of Bavaria 1049–1053, deposed 1053, died 1055.
Welf I, Duke of Bavaria, Duke of Bavaria 1070–1077 and 1096–1101.
Otto of Nordheim, Duke of Bavaria 1061–1070, deposed 1070, died 1083.
Henry IV, Holy Roman Emperor, Duke of Bavaria 1053–1054, 1055–1061, 1077–1096.
Henry IX, Duke of Bavaria, Duke of Bavaria 1120–1126, abdicated 1126 and died shortly thereafter.
Henry II, Duke of Austria, Duke of Bavaria 1141–1156, displaced 1156, died 1177.
Henry the Lion, Duke of Bavaria 1156–1180, deposed 1180, died 1195.

County of Barcelona 

Humfrid, deposed, 865, died after 872.
Bernard of Gothia, deposed, 878.
Sunyer, Count of Barcelona, abdicated 947, died 950.
Berenguer Ramon II, Count of Barcelona, abdicated 1097.

Béarn 

Mary, Viscount of Béarn, 1170–1171, died after 1187.

Duchy of Benevento 

Grimoald I of Benevento, Duke 651–662, died 671.
Audelais of Benevento, Duke 732–733, deposed.
Liutprand of Benevento, Duke 749–758, deposed, died after 759.
Radelchis II of Benevento, Prince 881–884 and 897–900, died 907.
Landulf IV of Benevento, Prince 981, died 892.

Duchy of Bohemia 

Boleslaus III (999–1002)
Boleslaus III (1003), second time
Jaromir (1003)
Boleslaus (IV) (1003–1004) (Piast; he was duke Boleslaus I of Poland)
Jaromir (1004–1012), second time
Oldřich (1012–1033)
Jaromir (1033–1034), third time
Oldrich (1034), second time
Bořivoj II (1101–1107)
Vladislaus I (1109–1117)
Borivoj II (1117–1120), second time
Vladislaus I (1120–1125), second time
Vladislaus II (1140–1172, king from 1158)
Frederick (1172–1173)
Soběslav II (1173–1178)
Frederick (1178–1189), second time
Wenceslaus II (1191–1192)
Ottokar I (1192–1193)
Vladislaus III Henry (1197)
Ottokar I (1197–1198)

Duchy of Bouillon 

Godfrey I the Captive 959–964, died 995.
Godfrey V, 1076–1095, died 1100.

Bulgarian Empire 
Sevar, 738-753, deposed
Kormisosh, 753-756, deposed and murdered
Vinekh, 756-762, deposed and murdered
Telets, 762-765, deposed and murdered
Sabin, 765–766, deposed, fled to Constantinopole.
Umor, 766, deposed, fled to Constantinople.
Toktu, 766-767, deposed and murdered near the Danube.
Pagan, 767-768, deposed and murdered near Varna.
Telerig, 768–777, forced to flee into exile.
Boris I, 852–889, abdicated 889 died 907.
Vladimir-Rasate, 889–893, deposed, blinded and imprisoned by his father.
Peter I of Bulgaria, 927-969, abdicated 969, died January 970.
Boris II, 969-971, abdicated 971
Roman, 976-991 (997), captured by the Byzantines in 991, died in captivity in 997.

White Croats 

Sobjeslav, ruler of the White Croats c. 990s, died 1004.

Byzantine Empire 
Heraklonas, deposed 641.
Justinian II, deposed 695, restored 705.
Leontios, deposed 698.
Tiberios III, deposed 705.
Philippikos Bardanes, deposed 713.
Anastasios II, deposed 715.
Theodosios III, deposed 717.
Constantine VI, deposed 797.
Irene, deposed 802.
Staurakios, deposed 811.
Michael I Rangabe, deposed 813.
Romanos I Lekapenos, deposed 944.
Michael V Kalaphates, deposed 1042.
Michael VI Bringas, deposed 1057.
Isaac I Komnenos, abdicated 1059.
Romanos IV Diogenes, deposed 1071.
Michael VII Doukas, deposed 1078.
Nikephoros III Botaneiates, deposed 1081.
Andronikos I Komnenos, deposed 1185.
Isaac II Angelos, deposed 1195, restored 1203, deposed again 1204.
Alexios III Angelos, deposed 1204.
Alexios IV Angelos, deposed 1204.
Alexios V Doukas, deposed 1204.
John IV Laskaris, deposed 1258.
Andronikos II Palaiologos, deposed 1328.

C

Umayyad Caliphate 

Ibrahim ibn al-Walid, 744, abdicated.

Abbasid Caliphate
Al-Qahir, 932–934, died 950.
Al-Muttaqi, 940–944, deposed and blinded.
Al-Mustakfi, 944–946, deposed and blinded.

Camerino 

Hubert, Duke of Spoleto, Margrave of Camerino 943–946, deposed 945/946, died 967/970.

Cappadocia 

Ariarathes VIII of Cappadocia, King of Cappadocia Ruler of Cappadocia c. 101 BCE – 96 BCE, deposed several times throughout his rule.
Ariarathes IX of Cappadocia, King of Cappadocia, deposed several times throughout his reign.
Ariobarzanes I Philoromaios of Cappadocia, King of Cappadocia from 95 BCE to c. 63 or 62 BCE, abdicated.

Principality of Capua 

Lando II of Capua, Count of Capua 861, deposed
Pandenulf of Capua, Count of Capua 862–863 and 879–882
Landenulf I of Capua, Count of Capua 885–887.
Laidulf of Capua, Prince of Capua 993–999, deposed.
Adhemar of Capua, Prince of Capua 1000, deposed by his own people.
Pandulf IV of Capua, Prince of Capua 1016–1022, 1026–1038 and 1047–1050.
Pandulf V of Capua, Prince of Capua 1022–1026, surrendered in 1026.
Guaimar IV of Salerno, Duke of Gaeta 1038–1047, died 1052.

Duchy of Carinthia 

Berthold, Duke of Bavaria, 927–938, united Carinthia with the duchy of Bavaria in 938.
Henry III, Duke of Bavaria, 976–978 and 985–989.
Otto I, Duke of Carinthia, 978–985 and 1002–1004.
Henry III, Holy Roman Emperor, 1039–1047.

Cerdanya 

Galindo Aznárez I, Count of Cerdanya 824–834, died 867.

China (Han dynasty) 

Prince He of Changyi, Emperor of China 74 BC, deposed, died 59 BC.
Ruzi Ying, Emperor of China AD 6–AD 9, deposed, died 25.
Liu Bian, Emperor of China 189, deposed, poisoned 190.

County of Conflent 

Aznar Galíndez I, 809–820, died 839.

Kingdom of Connacht 
Domnall Ua Conchobair, deposed 1106.
Ruaidrí Ua Conchobair, deposed 1186.

D

Denmark 

Eric III of Denmark, abdicated 1146.

Dublin 

Blácaire mac Gofrith King of Dublin 940 - 945 and 947 - 948 .
Amlaíb Cuarán King of Dublin 945 - 947 and 952–980 .
Godred Crovan King of Dublin 1079–1095, driven out of Dublin .
Domnall mac Muirchertaig ua Briain King of Dublin c.1094–1102 and 1103–???? .
Ascall mac Ragnaill King of Dublin 1160–1171, driven out and later killed .

Duklja 

Dobroslav II, King of Duklja 1101–1102, deposed and blinded.
Dobroslav III, King of Duklja 1102, deposed, blinded and castrated.
George I of Duklja, King of Duklja 1113–1118 and 1125–1131, deposed 1118, restored in 1125.

E

County of Edessa 

Baldwin I of Jerusalem, count of Edessa 1098–1100,died 1118.
Baldwin II of Jerusalem, count of Edessa 1100 to 1118, died 1131.
Joscelin II, Count of Edessa, count of Edessa 1131–1150, died 1159.

Ancient Egypt 

Teos of Egypt, Pharaoh 362–360 BC, overthrown, died in exile.
Nectanebo II, Pharaoh 360–343 BC, deposed by the Persian conquest, fled into exile.

Ayyubid Egypt 
Al-Aziz Uthman, 1193–1198, died 1200.

Kingdom of England
Aethelred the Unready, deposed 1013, regained the throne shortly before his death.
Edger II, the Ætheling, 1066, deposed, died 1126

Kingdom of Essex 
Sæbbi of Essex, 664 to 694, abdicated 694
Offa of Essex, ?-709, abdicated 709
Sigeric, abdicated in 798.
Sigered of Essex, 798-825, ceded his kingdom to Wessex

F

Francia 
Charles the Fat, deposed 887.
Charles the Simple, deposed 922.
Hugh Capet, Duke of the Franks, 956–987, merged into the French Crown 987,  died in 996.

Duchy of Friuli 

Ansfrid of Friuli, 694, blinded and exiled.
Ratchis, 739–744, died after 756.
Eberhard of Friuli, 846 to 863, died 866.
Berengar I of Italy, 874–890, died 924.

G

Duchy of Gaeta 

John V of Gaeta, 1012–1032, deposed in 1032, died 1040.
Guaimar IV of Salerno, 1040–1041, died 1052.

Kingdom of Galicia 
Hermeric, 406 or 419–438, abdicated 438, died 441.
Eboric, 583–584, deposed by Andeca.
Andeca, 584–585, deposed 585.
Malaric, 585, deposed and captured.
Alfonso Fróilaz, 925–926, driven out 926.
Alfonso IV of León, 929–931, abdicated, died 933.

Galilee 

Tancred FitzRobert, Prince of Galilee 1099–1101 deposed or abdicated, restored 1109–1112, died 1112.
Joscelin I, Prince of Galilee, ? –1109, deposed or abdicated, restored 1112–1118.

Duchy of Gascony 

Bernard II Tumapaler, 1039 to 1052, died 1064/1090.

Ghaznavid Empire 
 Ismail of Ghazni, 997–998, deposed by his brother Mahmud of Ghazni.   
 Muhammad of Ghazni, 1030–1031 and 1039–1041, died 1041.

Goguryeo 

Bojang of Goguryeo, King 642–668, deposed 668, died 682.

Eastern Turkic Khaganate 

Illig Qaghan, 621–630, captured in 630.

Seljuk Empire 

Ahmad Sanjar, 1118–1153, deposed 1153, died 1157.

H

Himyarite Kingdom 

Rabiah ibn Mudhar, deposed in the early 6th century.

Holy Roman Empire 
Charles the Fat, deposed 887.
Lambert II of Spoleto, deposed 896.
Louis the Blind, deposed 905.
Berengar I of Italy, deposed 924.

Kingdom of Hungary 
Peter Orseolo, 1038–1041, 1041–1044 died 1046.
Solomon, King of Hungary, 1063–1074, died 1087.
Stephen III of Hungary, 1161–1162, 1163–1172, died  1172.
Stephen IV of Hungary, 1163, died 1165.

I

Caucasian Iberia 

Nerse of Iberia, ruling prince of Iberia from c. 760 to 772 and again from 775 to 779/80.

Iraq 

Sultan al-Daula, Buyid Amir of Iraq 1012–1021, deposed 1021, died 1024.
Al-Malik al-Rahim, Buyid Amir of Iraq 1048–1055, died 1058/9.

Ireland 

Mael Seachlainn II Mór, High King of Ireland, deposed by Brian Ború in 1002, restored in 1014.

March of Istria 

Henry I of Istria, 1077–90, died 1127.
Engelbert II of Istria, 1103–34, died 1141.
Engelbert III, Margrave of Istria, 1134–71, died 1173.

Kingdom of Italy (Holy Roman Empire) 

Charles the Fat, 879–887, deposed, died 888.
Louis the Blind, 900–905, deposed 905, died 928.
Rudolph II of Burgundy, 922–926, deposed 926, died 937.
Berengar II of Italy, 950–963, deposed 963, died 966.
Conrad II of Italy, 1093–1098, deposed 1098, died 1101.

J

Japan 

Empress Kōgyoku, 642–645 and 655–661.
Empress Jitō, 686–697, died 702.
Empress Genmei, 707–715, died 721.
Empress Genshō, 715–724, died 748.
Emperor Shōmu, 724–749, died 756.
Emperor Junnin, 758–765, deposed and died shortly thereafter.
Empress Kōken, 749–758 and 764–770, died 770.
Emperor Kōnin, 770–781, died 782.
Emperor Heizei, 806–809, died 824.
Emperor Saga, 809–823, died 842.
Emperor Junna, 823–833, died 840.
Emperor Seiwa, 858–876, died 880.
Emperor Yōzei, 876–884, died 949.
Emperor Uda, 887–897, died 931.
Emperor Daigo, 897–930, abdicated 930 and died shortly thereafter.
Emperor Suzaku, 930–946, died 952.
Emperor Reizei, 984, died 991.
Emperor Kazan, 984–986, abdicated 986, died 1008.
Emperor Ichijō, 986–1011, abdicated 1011, and died shortly thereafter.
Emperor Sanjō, 1011–1016, abdicated 1016, died 1017.
Emperor Go-Suzaku, 1036–1045, abdicated 1045, died shortly thereafter.
Emperor Go-Sanjō, 1068–1073, abdicated, died shortly thereafter.
Emperor Shirakawa, 1073–1087, abdicated 1087, died 1129.
Emperor Toba, 1107–1123, abdicated 1123, died 1156.
Emperor Sutoku, 1123–1142, deposed or abdicated 1142, died 1164.
Emperor Go-Shirakawa, 1155–1158, abdicated 1158, died 1192.
Emperor Nijō, 1158–1165, abdicated 1165 shortly before his death.
Emperor Rokujō, 1165–1168, deposed 1168, died 1176.
Emperor Takakura, 1168–1180, abdicated 1180, died 1181.
Emperor Go-Toba, 1183–1198, abdicated 1198, died 1239.

Kingdom of Jerusalem 

Melisende, Queen of Jerusalem, 1131 to 1153, died 1161.

Jibal 

Fakhr al-Dawla, Buyid amir of Jibal 976–980 and 984–997, died 997.

Kingdom of Judah 

Jehoahaz of Judah, 609 BC, deposed by Necho II, died in exile.
Zedekiah, 597 BCE – 587 BCE, deposed, captured, blinded and taken into captivity.

K

Kashmir 
Nirjitavarman, King of Kashmir 907 and 923–924, deposed or abdicated 907, restored 923, died 924
Partha, King of Kashmir 907–923 and 936, deposed or abdicated 923, restored 936, died 936.
Chakravarman, King of Kashmir 935–936 and 936–938. Deposed 936, but restored shortly afterwards.
Sussala, King of Kashmir 1113–1120 and 1120–1127. Deposed 1120, but restored shortly afterwards. Died 1127.

Kingdom of Kent 

Hlothhere of Kent, exiled in 685.
Eadberht III Præn, 796–798. Deposed and captured by Cœnwulf of Mercia.
Ceolwulf I of Mercia, 821 to 823, deposed 823.
Baldred of Kent, until 825, when he was expelled by Æthelwulf of Wessex.

Greater Khorasan 

Muhammad ibn Tahir, governor of Khurasan, from 862 until 873, deposed, died around 890.

Pannonian Croatia 
Ljudevit Posavski, ruler of Khoruska within the Carolingian Empire, deposed 820, died 823.

Kievan Rus' 

Iziaslav I of Kiev, Grand Prince of Kiev 1054–1068 and 1069–1073, 1076–1078.
Vseslav of Polotsk, Grand Prince of Kiev in 1068–1069, deposed 1069, died 1101.

L

Kingdom of León 
Alfonso IV of León, King of León 925–931, abdicated, died 933.

Lesser Armenia 

Cotys IX, King of lesser Armenia, reigned 38 to until at least 47, forced to abdicate.

Lombardy 

Perctarit, King of the Lombards 661–662 and 671–688.
Garibald, King of the Lombards 671, deposed in favour of his uncle Perctarit.
Cunipert, King of the Lombards 688–689 and 689–700.
Ratchis, King of the Lombards 744–749.

Lotharingia/Lorraine 

Charles the Fat, King of Lotharingia 882–887, deposed, died 888.
Charles the Simple, King of Lotharingia 911–922, deposed 922, died 923.
Henry I, Duke of Bavaria, Duke of Lorraine 939–940, deposed 940, died 955.

Lower Lorraine 

Conrad II of Italy, Duke of Lower Lorraine 1076–1087, died 1101.
Henry, Duke of Lower Lorraine, Duke of Lower Lorraine 1101–1106, deposed 1106, died c. 1119.
Godfrey I of Leuven, Duke of Lower Lorraine 1106–1128, deposed, died 1139.

Lusatia 

Conrad, Margrave of Meissen, Margrave of Lusatia 1136–1156, retired to a monastery and died 1157.

Lydia 
Croesus, King of Lydia, 560 BC – 547 BC, deposed by the Persians, 547 BC.

M

Macedon 
Amyntas IV, King of Macedon, deposed 359 BC
Antipater II, King of Macedon, deposed 294 BC.
Demetrius I Poliorcetes, King of Macedon, deposed 288 BC.
Meleager (king), King of Macedon 278 BC, deposed in that same year.
Pyrrhus, King of Macedon and Epirus, deposed 285 BC, restored 274 BC.
Antigonus II Gonatas, King of Macedon, deposed 274 BC, restored 272 BC.
Perseus, deposed 168 BC.

County of Maine 

Fulk of Jerusalem, 1110–1126, died 1143.

Median Empire 

Astyages, 585 BCE–550 BCE, overthrown in 550.

Margraviate of Meissen 

Gunzelin, Margrave of Meissen, 1002–1009, deposed 1009, died c. 1017.
Henry III, Holy Roman Emperor, 1046
Egbert II, Margrave of Meissen, 1068–1090, deposed from Meissen 1090 and died soon thereafter.
Conrad, Margrave of Meissen, 1123–1156, retired to a monastery and died 1157.

Mercia 

Æthelred of Mercia King of Mercia 675–704, abdicated 704
Coenred of Mercia King of Mercia 704-709, abdicated 709
Beornred of Mercia King of Mercia in  757, deposed and fled 757
Ceolwulf I of Mercia King of Mercia 821 to 823, deposed 823
Wiglaf of Mercia  King of Mercia 827-829 and 830–839
Burgred of Mercia King of Mercia 852–874, deposed 874
Ælfwynn Lady of the Mercians, deposed 918

County of Mons 

Godfrey I, Count of Verdun, 974–998, deposed, died 1002.
Reginar IV, Count of Mons, 973–974 and 998–1013.

Sultanate of Morocco 

Al-Hasan ibn Kannun, 954–974, deposed, died 985.
Hammama Ibn El Moez, 1026–1033 and 1038–1040.

Mortain
Henry II of England, Count of Mortain 1151–1153, died 1189

N

Nanyue 

Zhao Jiande, King of Nanyue 112–111 BC, deposed by China in 111 BC.

Duchy of Naples 

Stephen II of Naples, 755–766, died 799.
Theoctistus of Naples, 818–821, replaced by Byzantium.
Contardus of Naples, 840, deposed by his people.
Sergius II of Naples, 870–877, deposed and blinded by his brother.

Principality of Nitra 

Pribina, Prince of Nitra 839–861, expelled by Rastislav.

Kingdom of Northumbria 

Eadwulf I of Northumbria, 704-705, deposed and exiled
Ceolwulf of Northumbria, 729–737, being deposed for a brief time in 731 or 732. He abdicated in 739 and entered a monastery
Eadberht of Northumbria, 737 or 738–758, abdicated, died 768
Æthelwald Moll of Northumbria, 759-765, deposed 765
Alhred of Northumbria, 765-774, deposed and went into exile
Æthelred I of Northumbria, 774-779 and 788/789-796
Osred II of Northumbria, 789 to 790, deposed and went into exile
Osbald of Northumbria, 796, abandoned by his people and went into exile
Eardwulf of Northumbria, 796 to 806, deposed 806
Æthelred II of Northumbria, c. 854-c. 858
Amlaíb Cuarán, twice, 941-944
Eric Bloodaxe, c. 948 and 952–954

Numidia 

Jugurtha, King of Numidia 117 to 105 BC, captured in war by Romans and executed in Rome 104 BC.
Hiempsal II, King of Numidia 88 to 60 BC, deposed by the Numidians in 81,restored by Gnaeus Pompeius Magnus.

O

P

Paris 

Odo of France, count of Paris until 888, died 898.

Parthian Empire 

Mithridates III of Parthia, 70–57 BC, deposed 57, died 53 BC.
Vonones I, 8–12, deposed 12, died 19.
Artabanus II of Parthia, 10–35 and 36–38, deposed 35, restored 36, died 38.
Tiridates III of Parthia, 35–36 AD, deposed and fled to Syria.
Vologases II of Parthia, 77–80, deposed.

Persian Empire 

Arsames, allegedly briefly king of Persia, deposed by Cyrus II.
Bessus (Artaxerxes V), ruling over small parts of Persia 330–329 BC, ordered the killing of Darius III. He was deposed and handed over to Alexander by his own people.

Kingdom of Pontus 

Polemon II, king of Pontus and Cicilia 38–62, forced to abdicate in Pontus by Nero.

Q

Qin 

Qin Shi Huang, King of Qin 246 BCE – 221 BCE, title merged into the imperial title of China 221 BCE, died 210 as Emperor of China.

R

Rascia 

Uroš II Prvoslav Prince of Rascia 1140-around 1155 and 1155–1161
Desa of Serbia Prince of Rascia 1155, 1162–1166

Rashtrakuta Kingdom 

Govinda IV, King of Rashtrakuta 930–935, deposed 935.

Rhine 

Henry II, Duke of Austria, Count Palatine of the Rhine 1140–1141, deposed 1141, died 1177.

Rome 
Vitellius, Emperor of Rome 69, abdicated a couple of days prior to execution. 
Valerian, Emperor of Rome 253–260, deposed and captured in 260.
Diocletian, Emperor of Rome 284–305, abdicated 305, died 311.
Maximian, Emperor of Rome 285–286, 286–305, 306–308, 310.

S

Saffarid amirate 

Tahir I, Saffarid amir 901–908, deposed and imprisoned in Baghdad.
Al-Layth, Saffarid amir 909–910, deposed, died 928.
Mohammed I of Persia, Saffarid amir 910–911, deposed.

Principality of Salerno 

Sico of Salerno, 851–853, died 855.
Adhemar of Salerno, 853–861, deposed by his own people.
Manso I of Amalfi, 981–983, died 1004.
John I of Amalfi, 981–982, died 1007.
Gisulf II of Salerno, (1052–1077), died around 1090.

Samanid Empire 

Mansur II, 997–999, deposed and blinded.

Duchy of Saxony 

Theoderic, Duke of Saxony, 743–744, captured 744.
Albert the Bear, 1138–42, abdicated 1142, died 1170.
Henry the Lion, 1142–80, deposed 1180, died 1195.

Seleucid Empire 

Antiochus Hierax, separatist ruler of parts of the Seleucid empire 246–before 226 BC, waging war to govern all of Anatolia; he was defeated and expelled to Egypt, where he was killed by robbers.

Kingdom of Scotland 
Duncan II, deposed 1094.
Donald III, deposed 1097.

Kingdom of Sicily 
William III, deposed 1194.

Sistan 

Abdallah ibn Ahmad, Amir of Sistan 922–923, deposed and captured.

Kingdom of Sweden 

Halsten Stenkilsson, King of Sweden 1067–1070 and 1079–1084.

T

Tabaristan 

Shams al-Mo'ali Abol-hasan Ghaboos ibn Wushmgir, Ziyarid ruler 977–981, deposed, died 1012.

Taranto 

Bohemond II of Antioch, Prince of Taranto 1088–1128, died 1131.
Roger II of Sicily, Prince of Taranto 1128–1131, died 1154.

Tuscany 

Boniface II, Margrave of Tuscany, Margrave of Tuscany 828–834, deposed 834, died 838.
Lambert, Margrave of Tuscany, Margrave of Tuscany 929–931, deposed 931, died after 938.
Boso, Margrave of Tuscany, Margrave of Tuscany 931–936, deposed 936, died 936.
Rainier, Margrave of Tuscany, Margrave of Tuscany 1014–1027, deposed 1027 by Conrad II of the Holy Roman Empire.
Welf II, Duke of Bavaria, Co-Margrave of Tuscany with his wife Matilda of Tuscany since 1089, left her side in 1095, died 1120.
Engelbert III, Margrave of Istria, Margrave of Tuscany 1135–1137.
Welf VI, Margrave of Tuscany 1152–1160 and 1167–1173.

U

Upper Lorraine 

Godfrey III, Duke of Lower Lorraine, Duke of Lower Lorraine 1044–1047, deposed, died 1069.

Urgell 

Galindo I Aznárez, Count of Urgell, 834.

V

Visigoths 
Wittiza (Achila), King of the Visigoths, deposed by Roderic in 710.

W

Western Chalukya 

Someshvara II, King of Western Chalukya 1068–1076, deposed 1076.

Wessex 

Ceawlin of Wessex king of Wessex 560–592, deposed 592 and died 593
Cenwalh of Wessex king of Wessex 643–645 and 648–674
Centwine of Wessex king of Wessex 676–685/686, abdicated 685/686 .
Cædwalla of Wessex king of Wessex 685 - 688, abdicated 688, died 689
Ine of Wessex king of Wessex 688 to 726, abdicated 726 .
Sigeberht of Wessex, 756–757, deposed and ultimately killed.
Æthelwulf of Wessex King of Wessex 839 – 856, gave over control of western Wessex to his son Æthelbald of Wessex . Died 858

Wei 
Xian Wen Di, King of Wei 465–471, deposed or abdicated 471, died 475.

Wu 
Modi of Wu, King of Wu 264–280, deposed or abdicated 280, died 281.
Jingdi of Wu, King of Wu 555–556, deposed or abdicated 556, died 558.
Lin Hai Wang, King of Wu 566–568, deposed or abdicated 568, died 570.
King Fuchai of Wu, King of Wu 495 BC – 473 BC, deposed 473 and committed suicide.
Yu Chung-Kuang, King of Wu 961–976, deposed 976, died 978.

X

Y

Z

Zhao 

King Youmiu (幽繆王), King of Zhao 236 BC–228 BC, captured and deposed by Qin.
King Dai (代王), King of Zhao 228 BC–222 BC captured and deposed by Qin.

See also
List of monarchs who abdicated
List of monarchs who lost their thrones in the 19th century
List of monarchs who lost their thrones in the 18th century
List of monarchs who lost their thrones in the 17th century
List of monarchs who lost their thrones in the 16th century
List of monarchs who lost their thrones in the 15th century
List of monarchs who lost their thrones in the 14th century
List of monarchs who lost their thrones in the 13th century

 
 
 
 
12etc